Horacio Antonio Castellanos Alves (Montevideo, 1905 – Montevideo, 1983), better known as Pintín Castellanos, was an Uruguayan pianist, composer, lyricist and conductor of tango music.​ He was recognized as one of the great tango composers from Uruguay, enjoying success throughout a long career. The song "La puñalada" was his greatest creation. Recorded as a milonga for the first time in 1937 by Juan D'Arienzo, the song sold 20 million copies.

References

Uruguayan composers
1905 births
1983 deaths